A cermet is a composite material composed of ceramic (cer) and metal (met) materials.

A cermet can combine attractive properties of both a ceramic, such as high temperature resistance and hardness, and those of a metal, such as the ability to undergo plastic deformation. The metal is used as a binder for an oxide, boride, or carbide. Generally, the metallic elements used are nickel, molybdenum, and cobalt. Depending on the physical structure of the material, cermets can also be metal matrix composites, but cermets are usually less than 20% metal by volume.

Cermets are used in the manufacture of resistors (especially potentiometers), capacitors, and other electronic components which may experience high temperature.

Cermets are used instead of tungsten carbide in saws and other brazed tools due to their superior wear and corrosion properties.  Titanium nitride (TiN), titanium carbonitride (TiCN), titanium carbide (TiC) and similar  can be brazed like tungsten carbide if properly prepared, however they require special handling during grinding.

Composites of MAX phases, an emerging class of ternary carbides or nitrides with aluminium or titanium alloys have been studied since 2006 as high-value materials exhibiting favourable properties of ceramics in terms of hardness and compressive strength alongside ductility and fracture toughness typically associated with metals. Such cermet materials, including aluminium-MAX phase composites, have potential applications in automotive and aerospace applications.

Some types of cermets are also being considered for use as spacecraft shielding as they resist the high velocity impacts of micrometeoroids and orbital debris much more effectively than more traditional spacecraft materials such as aluminum and other metals.

History
After World War II, the need to develop high temperature and high stress-resistant materials became clear.  During the war, German scientists developed oxide base cermets as substitutes for alloys.  They saw a use for this for the high-temperature sections of new jet engines as well as high temperature turbine blades.  Today ceramics are routinely implemented in the combuster part of jet engines because it provides a heat-resistant chamber.  Ceramic turbine blades have also been developed.  These blades are lighter than steel and allow for greater acceleration of the blade assemblies.
 
The United States Air Force saw potential in the material technology and became one of the principal sponsors for various research programs in the US.  Some of the first universities to research were Ohio State University, University of Illinois, and Rutgers University.

The word cermet was actually coined by the United States Air Force, the idea being that they are a combination of two materials, a metal and a ceramic.  Basic physical properties of metals include ductility, high strength, and high thermal conductivity.  Ceramics possess basic physical properties such as a high melting point, chemical stability, and especially oxidation resistance.

The first ceramic metal material developed used magnesium oxide (MgO), beryllium oxide (BeO), and aluminum oxide (Al2O3) for the ceramic part.

Quality control in manufacturing these ceramic metal composites was hard to standardize.  Production had to be kept to small batches and within these batches, the properties varied greatly.  Failure of the material was usually a result of undetected flaws usually nucleated during processing.

The existing technology in the 1950s reached a limit for jet engines where little more could be improved.  Subsequently, engine manufactures were reluctant to develop ceramic metal engines.
Interest was renewed in the 1960s when silicon nitride and silicon carbide were looked at more closely.  Both materials possessed better thermal shock resistance, high strength, and moderate thermal conductivity.

Cermet production, Helipot Division of Beckman Instruments, 1966

Applications

Ceramic-to-metal joints and seals
Cermets were first used extensively in ceramic-to-metal joint applications.  Construction of vacuum tubes was one of the first critical systems, with the electronics industry employing and developing such seals. German scientists recognized that vacuum tubes with improved performance and reliability could be produced by substituting ceramics for glass. Ceramic tubes can be outgassed at higher temperatures.  Because of the high-temperature seal, ceramic tubes withstand higher temperatures than glass tubes.  Ceramic tubes are also mechanically stronger and less sensitive to thermal shock than glass tubes.  Today, cermet vacuum tube coatings have proved to be key to solar hot water systems.

Ceramic-to-metal mechanical seals have also been used.  Traditionally they have been used in fuel cells and other devices that convert chemical, nuclear, or thermionic energy to electricity.  The ceramic-to-metal seal is required to isolate the electrical sections of turbine-driven generators designed to operate in corrosive liquid-metal vapors.

Bioceramics

Bioceramics play an extensive role in biomedical materials.  The development of these materials and diversity of manufacturing techniques has broadened the applications that can be used in the human body.  They can be in the form of thin layers on metallic implants, composites with a polymer component, or even just porous networks.  These materials work well within the human body for several reasons.  They are inert, and because they are resorbable and active, the materials can remain in the body unchanged.  They can also dissolve and actively take part in physiological processes, for example, when hydroxylapatite, a material chemically similar to bone structure, can integrate and help bone grow into it.  Common materials used for bioceramics include alumina, zirconia, calcium phosphate, glass ceramics, and pyrolytic carbons.

One important use of bioceramics is in hip replacement surgery. The materials used for the replacement hip joints were usually metals such as titanium, with the hip socket usually lined with plastic.  The multiaxial ball was tough metal ball but was eventually replaced with a longer-lasting ceramic ball.  This reduced the roughening associated with the metal wall against the plastic lining of the artificial hip socket.  The use of ceramic implants extended the life of the hip replacement parts.

Dental cermets are also used in dentistry as a material for fillings and prostheses.

Transportation

Ceramic parts have been used in conjunction with metal parts as friction materials for brakes and clutches.

Electrical heaters 
Cermets are used as heating elements in electric resistance heaters. One construction technique starts with the cermet material formulated as an ink, then prints it on a substrate and cures it with heat. This technique allows manufacture of complex shapes of heating elements. Examples of applications for cermet heating elements include thermostat heaters, heat sources for bottle sterilization, coffee carafe warmers, heaters for oven control, and laser printer fuser heaters.

Other applications
The United States Army and British Army have had extensive research in the development of cermets.  These include the development of lightweight ceramic projectile-proof armor for soldiers and also Chobham armor.

Cermets are also used in machining on cutting tools.

Cermets are also used as the ring material in high-quality line guides for fishing rods.

A cermet of depleted fissiable material (e.g. uranium, plutonium) and sodalite has been researched for its benefits in the storage of nuclear waste.  Similar composites have also been researched for use as a fuel form for nuclear reactors  and nuclear thermal rockets.

As nanostructured cermet, this material is used in the optical field, such as solar absorbers/selective surface. Thanks to the size of the particles (~5 nm), surface plasmons on the metallic particles are generated and enable the heat transmission.

For reasons regarding luxury, cermet is sometimes found to be case materials for some watches, including Jaeger-LeCoultre's Deep Sea Chronograph Vintage Cermet watch. It was also used (November 2019) on the bezel of the flagship diver Seiko Prospex LX Line Limited Edition watch.

See also

 Glidcop
 Nuclear fuel
 Nuclear fuel cycle

Notes

Further reading

External links 
 A Review of Fifty Years of Space Nuclear Fuel Development Programs  (broken)

Composite materials